Qareh Qanlu (also Romanized as Qareh Qānlū; also known as Karaganlu, Qaraghānlu, Qarah Qātlū, and Qarāqānlū) is a village in Kaghazkonan-e Markazi Rural District, Kaghazkonan District, Meyaneh County, East Azerbaijan Province, Iran. At the 2006 census, its population was 94, in 23 families.

References 

Populated places in Meyaneh County